Oxyrhopus vanidicus  is a species of snake in the family Colubridae.  The species is native to Brazil, Colombia, Venezuela, Ecuador, and Peru.

References

Oxyrhopus
Snakes of South America
Reptiles of Brazil
Reptiles of Colombia
Reptiles of Venezuela
Reptiles of Ecuador
Reptiles of Peru
Reptiles described in 2009